Kishore Te (24 March 1978 – 6 March 2015) was an Indian film editor who worked in Tamil, Kannada and Telugu films. For his work in Aadukalam (2011) and Visaranai (2015), he won the National Film Award for Best Editing.

Career
At age 21, Kishore joined film editors B. Lenin and V. T. Vijayan as an assistant. He worked on more than 70 Tamil, Telugu, and Hindi films as an assistant editor. His first independent film as an editor was the Tamil film Eeram (2009) produced by Shankar and directed by Arivazhagan.

Death
Kishore suddenly swooned while he was editing a Vetrimaaran film and upon being rushed to the hospital, he was diagnosed with a brain clot.  Even though a surgery was performed, he never regained consciousness.

Kishore died on 6 March 2015 at the age of 36.

Filmography

References

External links
 

1978 births
2015 deaths
Kannada film editors
Tamil film editors
Best Editor National Film Award winners
Telugu film editors
People from Viluppuram district
Tamil Nadu State Film Awards winners
Film editors from Tamil Nadu